Clive Norling (born April 1950) is a former Welsh international rugby union referee. Norling is one of the world's most experienced referees, having officiated in a then-record 25 international tests prior to his retirement in 1992, including a quarter final of the inaugural Rugby World Cup. In 1998, he took over from Ken Rowlands as the Welsh Director of Refereeing, a post he held until 2003.

After retiring from refereeing, Norling completed a master's degree in business and taught at the Swansea Institute of Higher Education, before succumbing in 2002 to a crippling clinical depression, which forced him to leave his Welsh rugby role and left him close to suicidal. The depression continued until 2009. Norling credits his wife, Mair, and BBC reporter Phil Steele for helping him recover.

References

External links
Welsh Rugby Union article
BBC article

Welsh rugby union referees
1950 births
Living people
People educated at Neath Grammar School for Boys
Rugby World Cup referees
Sportspeople from Neath